Chen Changwen (born 1944) is a Chinese politician and lawyer who was the secretary of the Straits Exchange Foundation and the president of the Red Cross Society of the Republic of China. Chen was chairman and chief executive officer of Lee and Li, one of Taiwan's largest law firms, and currently serves as senior partner.

Biography
Chen Changwen was born in 1944 in Kunming, Yunnan, with his ancestral hometown in Fuzhou. His father, Chen Shouren, was a soldier, who graduated from the Whampoa Military Academy. He was the fourth child of four children.

In 1949, after the Chinese Civil War, Chen Shouren went to Taiwan with his family. In October, Chen Shouren was transferred to Sichuan and appointed chief of staff of the 69th army. Later, he died in Qionglai.

Chen Changwen was raised in Taipei. He graduated from the law college in the National Taiwan University in 1967. Chen went to Canada to study law.  At the University of British Columbia, he received his LLM in 1969 and a law degree from Harvard University in 1972.

In the 1980s, Chen served as the president of the Red Cross Society of the Republic of China.

In the early 1990s, Chen was appointed the secretary of the Straits Exchange Foundation.

References

External links
Official Blog

1944 births
People from Kunming
National Taiwan University alumni
Harvard Law School alumni
Living people
Peter A. Allard School of Law alumni
Taiwanese people from Yunnan